St Edmund's School Canterbury is a private day and boarding school located in Canterbury, Kent, England and established in 1749. The extensive school grounds were acquired in 1855. The school currently caters for girls and boys aged 3–18, including the Choristers of Canterbury Cathedral.

The school charges full boarders up to £40,272 per annum (2021/2022) and is among the most expensive Headmasters' and Headmistresses' Conference (HMC) schools in the UK.

The School is currently headed by Edward O’Connor (2018 – Present)

History 
St Edmund's School Canterbury was first established in 1749, as the Clergy Orphan Society (later the Clergy Orphan Corporation) in Yorkshire. In 1812, the school moved to St John's Wood at the nursery end of Lord's Cricket Ground. An associated school for girls was located on the same site, but later moved to become St Margaret's School, Bushey, in Hertfordshire.

In 1855, the school moved to Canterbury. The acquisition of property and financing to build the school was provided by Samuel Wilson Warneford. The main school building was designed by Philip Charles Hardwick, architect of Charterhouse School and Adare Manor. The chapel wing of the school was completed in 1858 and remains in daily use.

The choristers of Canterbury Cathedral began their education at the school in 1972. Grant house was established from the former Big School. After 20 years the school reverted to the traditional 4-house system.

In 1982, girls were admitted to the school for the first time.

In 2016 the school was fined £18,000 and ordered to pay costs of £9,670, after a seven-year-old child nearly drowned at the Summerfest event held at the school. The school did not ensure the lifeguards held the relevant qualifications and it could not be sure the guards had any experience or competency.

The Archbishop of Canterbury is the school’s patron.

Facilities 

The main building houses classrooms, boarding facilities, dining hall, library and administration offices.  Further buildings provide teaching areas for Art, Design Technology and Science. The Francis Musgrave Performing Arts Centre comprises a purpose-built music school with recording studio, practice rooms and recital hall. There is also a 450-seat theatre for concerts and drama productions.

Sports facilities include a sports hall, gym, all-weather astro pitch, golf course, playing fields, 8 tennis courts, a shooting range and a swimming pool. Additional boarding houses are set in the grounds of the school.

The Junior School and Pre-Prep School are located on the same site in their own buildings.

Houses 
The Senior School is divided into four day houses:

In Junior School there are four houses: 

The boarding houses:

Cathedral choir 
In 1972, the previously independent Canterbury Cathedral Choir School, which educated the choristers of Canterbury Cathedral, joined the Junior School as the Choir House. Choir House remains at a detached location beside the cathedral, and provided transport conveys the choirboys between the two sites.

Heads 
The name of the first Headmaster, between the years 1751 and 1762, is unknown.
The Revd Daniel Addison (1762–1783)
The Revd Daniel Addison (1783–1804)
The Revd Thomas Cripps (1804–1805)
The Revd Evan Jones (1805–1813)
The Revd William Farley (1813–1816)
The Revd Thomas Wharton (1817–1837)
The Revd George Bewsher (1837–1841)
The Revd. Daniel Butler (1841–1867)
The Revd Charles Matheson (1867–1891)
The Revd Arthur W. Upcott (1891–1902)
The Revd Edward J.W. Houghton (1902–1908)
The Revd Walter F. Burnside (1908–1932)
The Revd Henry Balmforth (1932–1941)
The Revd Frederick F.S. Williams (1942–1945)
William M. Thoseby (1945–1959)
Walter Stephen Jones (1 term 1959)
B. Michael S.Hoban (1960–1964)
Francis R. Rawes (1964–1978)
John V. Tyson (1978–1994)
A. Nicholas Ridley (1994–2005)
Jeremy M. Gladwin (2005–2011)
Louise J. Moelwyn-Hughes (2011–2018)
Edward O'Connor (2018 – )

Reviews 
The Good Schools Guide note that after the schools' rebranding it was no longer marketing itself as a music and drama school, nor did it continue to describe itself as "non-selective".

The Independent Schools Inspectorate reported in 2015 that the school met all the requirements of the Education (Independent School Standards) Regulations.

Notable former pupils 

Benjamin Handley Geary VC, Victoria Cross Recipient
Orlando Bloom, Actor
Stuart Townend, Athlete, soldier and schoolmaster
Dan Caplen, Musician
Willoughby Allen, Priest
Jon Baddeley, Auctioneer
Thomas Crick, Anglican priest
Lawrence Durrell, Novelist
Darren Henley, Chief Executive of Arts Council England
Hope Gill, Anglican bishop
Michael Goodliffe, Actor
Sanjeev Gupta, Industrialist
Bernard Howlett, Soldier
Geoffrey Iliff, Anglican bishop
Robin Jackman, Cricketer
Ben Kemp, Cricketer
Freddy Kempf, Pianist
John Long, Priest
Arthur Lovekin, Journalist and politician
Nigel MacArthur, Broadcaster
Sir Gordon MacMillan, British Army General
Chris Nickols, Air Marshal
Alan Payne, Cricketer
John Peacey, Cricketer
David Pettit, Cricketer
John Pinsent, Classicist
Roger Royle, Priest and broadcaster
Hedley Sparks, Anglican priest and academic
Max Spiers, Conspiracy theorist
Mark Strudwick, British Army officer who served as General Officer Commanding Scotland 
Adar Poonawalla, CEO Serum Institute of India
Maggie Cheung, Hong Kong & International Actress

References

External links

 
 Good Schools Guide
 Choristers of Canterbury Cathedral

Choir schools in England
Private schools in Kent
 
Member schools of the Headmasters' and Headmistresses' Conference
Schools in Canterbury
Educational institutions established in 1749
Boarding schools in Kent
1749 establishments in England